Robert Gardiner may refer to:

Politicians
Robert Gardiner (politician) (1879–1945), farmer and federal Member of Parliament from Canada
Robert Gardiner (MP for Bristol), see Bristol (UK Parliament constituency)
 Robert K. A. Gardiner (1914–1994), Ghanaian statesman and economist
 Robert Gardner, d.1619 Elmswell, England. Chief justice and viceroy of Ireland.

Others
 Sir Robert Septimus Gardiner (1856–1939), English businessman
 Robert Gardiner, actor in Maidstone
 Robert David Lion Gardiner (1911–2004), owner of Gardiners Island
 Robert Gardiner (Chief Justice) (1540–1620), Lord Chief Justice of Ireland, 1586–1604
 Robert Gardiner (British Army officer) (1781–1864)
 Robert Hallowell Gardiner (1782–1864), of Gardiner, Maine
 Robert Hallowell Gardiner III (1855–1924), lawyer and ecumenist and descendant of Robert Hallowell Gardiner
 Robert Gardiner (cricketer) (1878–1959), Scottish cricketer and curler

See also
Robert Gardner (disambiguation)
Bob Gardiner (disambiguation)